Old Stoke or Oldstoke, may refer to:

Stoke, Suffolk, England, UK
Stoke Charity, Hampshire, England, UK

See also 

 Old Church Stoke
 Stoke (disambiguation)